PolyAMPS, or poly(2-acrylamido-2-methyl-1-propanesulfonic acid) (trademark of the Lubrizol Corporation), is an organic polymer. It is water-soluble, forms gels when cross linked, and acts as a strong anionic polyelectrolyte. It can be used for ion exchange resins. It can form hydrogels.

See also
 2-Acrylamido-2-methylpropane sulfonic acid (AMPS)

Acrylate polymers
Polyelectrolytes